Rose Peak may refer to:

 Rose Peak (Inner Mongolia), China, a part of the Arxan–Chaihe Scenic Area
 Rose Peak (Shetlands), in the South Shetland Islands
 Rose Peak (California), highest point in Alameda County, California

See also
 Rose Mountain (disambiguation)
 Mount Rose (disambiguation)